Göming is a municipality in the district of Salzburg-Umgebung in the state of Salzburg in Austria.

Geography
Göming lies in the northern part of the Flachgau east of Oberndorf bei Salzburg. Other neighboring municipalities are Lamprechtshausen on the north and Nußdorf am Haunsberg on the east and south..

References

Cities and towns in Salzburg-Umgebung District